The 2013 Alabama Crimson Tide softball team is an American softball team, representing the University of Alabama for the 2013 NCAA softball season. The Crimson Tide played its home games at Rhoads Stadium. After winning the 2012 National Championship, the 2013 team looks to make the postseason for the 15th straight year, and the Women's College World Series for ninth time. This season represents the 17th season of softball in the school's history.

2013 Roster 

2013 Alabama Crimson Tide Softball Roster

Schedule 

|-
!colspan=9| UNI-Dome Tournament

|-
!colspan=9|

|-
!colspan=9| La Quinta Inn at the Airport Tournament

|-
!colspan=9|

|-
!colspan=9| Easton Bama Bash Presented by DRASH

|-
!colspan=9|

|-
!colspan=9| Easton Classic

|-
!colspan=9|

|-
!colspan=9|SEC Tournament

|-
!colspan=9| NCAA Tuscaloosa Regional

|-
!colspan=9| NCAA Knoxville Super Regional

Ranking movement

Awards and honors 
Kayla Braud
SEC Preseason Team
USA Softball Collegiate Player of the Year Watch List
Senior CLASS Award Candidate
Molly Fichtner
SEC Player of the Week; April 8
Kaila Hunt
SEC Preseason Team
USA Softball Collegiate Player of the Year Watch List
Haylie McCleney
SEC Freshman of the Week; February 11, February 25
Jackie Traina
SEC Preseason Team
USA Softball Collegiate Player of the Year Watch List

See also 
 2013 Alabama Crimson Tide baseball team

References 

2013 Southeastern Conference softball season
Alabama Crimson Tide softball seasons
Alabama Crimson Tide softball season